The Facts of Life: And Other Dirty Jokes is a memoir written by American country music singer-songwriter Willie Nelson, published by Random House.

Content
Co-written by Nelson and Larry McMurtry, the book was published by Random House on April 8, 2003. The publication consists in biographical material from Nelson, not ordered chronologically, with a series of anecdotes of his early life and life as a musician. The material is complemented by the addition of lyrics, pictures from Nelson's youth and the inclusion of jokes.

Reception
Publishers Weekly delivered a favorable review, commenting on its Non sequitur-style "Fans and readers with ADD will love it". Austin Chronicle opined "There's not much in the author's way with a phrase, but this is still a fun, quick read". Entertainment Weekly rated the book "B−", describing Nelson's writing as sometimes "loose to the point of laziness".

References

2003 non-fiction books
Music autobiographies
American autobiographies
Books by Willie Nelson